Gail Cort (born 5 August 1956) is a Canadian rower. She competed at the 1976 Summer Olympics and the 1984 Summer Olympics.

References

1956 births
Living people
Canadian female rowers
Olympic rowers of Canada
Rowers at the 1976 Summer Olympics
Rowers at the 1984 Summer Olympics
Rowers from St. Catharines
20th-century Canadian women